Suresh Paswan (Satish Paswan) (born  1965) is an Indian politician. He was a Member of the Jharkhand Legislative Assembly from the Deoghar Assembly constituency from 2004 to 2005 and 2009 to 2014. He was a minister in Government of Jharkhand headed by Hemant Soren.

He fought for the Jharkhand elections in 2014 but was lost to Narayan Das. He is associated with the Rashtriya Janata Dal.

References

State cabinet ministers of Jharkhand
Rashtriya Janata Dal politicians
Living people
Year of birth uncertain
Place of birth missing (living people)
Year of birth missing (living people)
1965 births
Jharkhand MLAs 2000–2005
Jharkhand MLAs 2009–2014
People from Deoghar district